The Minister of Water and Sanitation is a Minister in the Cabinet of South Africa. The Ministry was merged with the Minister of Human Settlements, Water and Sanitation on 27 May 2019, and separated again in 2021.

References

External links
Department of Water and Sanitation

Lists of political office-holders in South Africa